Alexander Anthony Farrelly (December 29, 1923 – September 10, 2002) was an American politician and the fourth elected Governor of the United States Virgin Islands, serving from 1987 to 1995.

Farrelly graduated from St. John's University, Queens, New York in 1954 with a bachelor's degree in law. He later went on to earn a master's degree in law from Yale University in 1958.

Farrelly tackled many major issues during his two terms as governor, including increasing the number of affordable housing, enhancing the education and health system in the territory and purchasing the West Indian Company from the Danish government, which will continue to be one of the beacons of the Farrelly/Hodge Administration. The project that most impacted the economy and future of the Virgin Islands was separating the Department of Agriculture and Tourism into separate Departments. He and his consultant, Larry Tunison, oversaw the organization and development of the Department of Tourism. Farrelly also had to manage a territory that was ravaged by Hurricane Hugo, and that destroyed most of the homes and infrastructure on St. Croix and St. Thomas. Farrelly will be remembered for the unprecedented number of women he hired in his administration, from Commissioners to Judges to members of his security detail.

In 1991, Joan Harrigan married Farrelly, becoming the First Lady of the Territory. Mrs. Harrigan-Farrelly continued to work full-time as the Director of the Coastal Zone Management, while carrying out her responsibilities as First Lady. Mrs. Harrigan-Farrelly has been and continues to be a champion on issues concerning empowering women and reducing and eliminating domestic violence; teenage pregnancy prevention, literacy issues and environmental issues.

Farrelly and his wife were married for eleven years before he died at his home in Arlington, Virginia, on September 10, 2002.

External links
Alexander Farrelly.com, a tribute site

|-

|-

1923 births
2002 deaths
Democratic Party governors of the United States Virgin Islands
Democratic Party of the Virgin Islands politicians
Governors of the United States Virgin Islands
Yale Law School alumni